Peter Lawson Jones is an American actor, philanthropist and politician of the Democratic party.  A resident of Shaker Heights, Ohio, he formerly served as a county commissioner in Cuyahoga County.

Early years
He was born December 23, 1952 to Charles and Margaret Jones, who paid twenty percent over asking - the black tax - to buy a house in Shaker Heights. When asked to not pay the higher fee, his mother was said to have responded, "My son is going to Shaker schools because I understand they’re very good." He received his AB magna cum laude from Harvard University in 1975, and his juris doctor from Harvard in 1980. He was admitted to the Ohio State Bar in November 1980.

Political career
Jones served on the Shaker Heights city council, and in 1994, he was the running mate for gubernatorial candidate Rob Burch. He served as a state representative from 1997 to 2002. In February 2002, after county commissioner Jane Campbell was elected mayor of Cleveland, the Cuyahoga County Democratic Party appointed Jones to replace her on the commission.

He has extensive professional and community affiliations, and works at the law firm Roetzel & Andress in addition to his legislative duties.

In 2007, Jones made news with two dissenting votes on major decisions. He opposed the sales tax increase for Cuyahoga County from 7.5% to 7.75%. The tax, earmarked to pay for a new convention center and medical mart, was passed by a 2–1 vote (Jimmy Dimora and Tim Hagan voted for it), and it took effect on October 1, 2007.   Jones also opposed the demolition of the Ameritrust Tower, which the county bought as a potential location for a new administration building, but later decided to sell.

On January 26, 2009, WKYC's Tom Beres reported that Jones was considering running for the U.S. Senate seat being vacated by the retiring Sen. George Voinovich. But withdrew from the idea and went on to endorse Lee Fisher in the primaries, and now in the general election.

In November 2009, the voters of Cuyahoga County replaced the commission form of county government with a charter and an elected county executive who was elected

Acting career
After loosening his ties to the political realm, Jones started acting in many independent films in the Cleveland area.

Philanthropy
Jones created the Charles & Margaret Jones Scholarship Fund at College Now Greater Cleveland in honor of his late parents' legacy and commitment to education.

Filmography

Film

Television

Playwright

See also
 Election Results, Ohio Lieutenant Governor
 Election Results, Ohio Lieutenant Governor (Democratic Primaries)

References

External links
 Cuyahoga County official biography

Living people
County commissioners in Ohio
Male actors from Cleveland
Politicians from Cleveland
Politicians from Shaker Heights, Ohio
Democratic Party members of the Ohio House of Representatives
African-American state legislators in Ohio
Harvard Law School alumni
African-American lawyers
Lawyers from Cleveland
County officials in Ohio
21st-century American politicians
1952 births
21st-century African-American politicians
20th-century African-American people